William Jordison Thomas (December 16, 1927–January 31, 2020) was the  Archdeacon of Northumberland from 1982 to 1993.

Born on 16 December 1927, he was educated at Giggleswick School  and did his National Service in the Royal Navy between 1946 and 1948. After graduating from King's College, Cambridge he studied for the priesthood at Ripon College Cuddesdon. He served curacies at St Anthony of Egypt, Newcastle upon Tyne and  Berwick Parish Church and incumbencies at Alwinton, Alston cum Garrigill and Glendale before his Archdeacon's appointment.

He died on 31 January 2020 and is buried in St Bartholomew's Church, Whttingham, England.

References

People educated at Giggleswick School
Alumni of King's College, Cambridge
Alumni of Ripon College Cuddesdon
Archdeacons of Northumberland

1927 births

2020 deaths